Paraheda shiva mandir is situated at near Partapur town in Garhi tahsil of Banswara. It is 25 km from Banswara district of Indian state of Rajasthan. The temple is known for its old and fine sculptures.

Many people come here for worship of Shiva Bhagvan. There is wrecked nandi's idol in front of temple. Arthuna famous for Shiva temple is 15–16 km from here via Partapur. Arthuna was capital of VAGAD. Paraheda village is known as ‘PARENDA’. There are several small Shiva temple and ragged hospices around paraheda shiva temple. A famous temple of shiva in bhagora town which is almost 3 km from here. The temple is called bhagoreshaver shiva temple.

Paraheda images

Shiva temples in Rajasthan
Tourist attractions in Banswara district